Belmopan is an electoral constituency in the Cayo District represented in the House of Representatives of the National Assembly of Belize since 2020 by Oscar Mira of the People's United Party (PUP).

Profile

Along with Cayo North East, the Belmopan constituency was created for the 2008 general election. It encompasses the city of Belmopan – the Belizean national capital – and the immediate surrounding area. It is entirely surrounded by the Cayo South constituency from which it was comprised.

Area Representatives

Elections

References

Political divisions in Belize
Belmopan (Belize House constituency)
Belizean House constituencies established in 2008